Creniceras is a rather small Upper Jurassic ammonite with a shell in the range of about 1.6 cm in diameter,(about 1/2 in). The shell of Creniceras is eccentrically coiled, compressed, and generally smooth, except for a median row of cockscomb serrations on the body chamber and the possibility of blunt ribbing on the sides.

Creniceras, named by Munier-Chalmas in 1892, is included in the oppeliid subfamily Teramelliceratinae, and has been found in Upper Jurassic (Oxfordian age) sediments in Europe and Syria.

References

Arkell et al, 1957. Mesozoic Ammonoidea, Treatise on Invertebrate Paleontology Part L. Geological Society of America and Univ. Kansas Press. p. L282.

Jurassic ammonites
Ammonites of Europe
Oxfordian life
Oppeliidae
Ammonitida genera